The Bakhmutka (formerly also Bakhmut, now often incorrectly Bakhmutovka) is a river in the Donetsk Oblast of Ukraine; a right tributary of the Siverskyi Donets. 

The length is 88 km and the drainage basin area is 1680 km2. It thaws in early March and freezes in December. The water is partially used for technical needs and for irrigation. 

The cities of Bakhmut and Siversk are located on the Bakhmutka.

References

 Bakhmutka
Rivers of Donetsk Oblast
Rivers of Ukraine
Donbas